The Buckingham Friends Meeting House is a historic Quaker meeting house at 5684 Lower York Road (U.S. Route 202) in Buckingham Township, Bucks County, Pennsylvania.  Built in 1768 in a "doubled" style, it is nationally significant as a model for many subsequent Friends Meeting Houses.  It was declared a National Historic Landmark in 2003.

History
The first meeting house on the site was built from logs in 1705–1708 by English Quakers, some of the earliest settlers in the area. The second meetinghouse was a wooden frame building. The third was a stone building built sometime around 1731. Remnants of some of these buildings, especially stone mounting blocks used to help mount horses, are scattered around the property.

A stone schoolhouse was built to the east of the meetinghouse in 1798, and forms the nucleus of the current Buckingham Friends School. The current building was completed in 1768 and was the first of the doubled type meeting houses that became the standard form of Quaker meeting house for the next 100 years.

Earlier meeting houses were generally single-cell structures, that were often divided by a partition into two unequally sized for separate men's and women's business meetings. Men and women met together for worship and were separated for business meetings. Buckingham's design is a two-cell symmetrical form with roughly equal-sized sections.

After this change in design, men and women would sit on separate sides of the partition for both worship and business meetings, with the partition closed only during business meetings. Around this time, written Quaker discipline became more standardized, which may have encouraged the two-cell form as a uniform meeting house design. In particular, marrying a non-Quaker became grounds for disownment or being "read out of the meeting." Since marriage was in the purview of the women's business meeting, their business meeting acquired a higher status and needed increased space.

The use of the Buckingham Meeting House as a model began within a few years of its completion. In New Jersey at least five meeting houses were built in the doubled style by 1788, with several being designed by committees who travelled to see the Meeting House.

The Quaker ideal of simplicity was perhaps ignored by the Buckingham Meeting House's Georgian architectural design, which may reflect the affluence of the Buckingham Quakers.

See also
Horsham Friends Meeting
List of National Historic Landmarks in Pennsylvania
National Register of Historic Places listings in Bucks County, Pennsylvania

References

External links

SAH Archipedia Building Entry

Quaker meeting houses in Pennsylvania
National Historic Landmarks in Pennsylvania
Churches on the National Register of Historic Places in Pennsylvania
1705 establishments in Pennsylvania
Churches in Bucks County, Pennsylvania
Historic American Buildings Survey in Pennsylvania
18th-century Quaker meeting houses
National Register of Historic Places in Bucks County, Pennsylvania